The "Alien Costume Saga" is a comic book story thread appearing in Marvel Comics comic book series The Amazing Spider-Man #252–263, The Spectacular Spider-Man #90–100, Marvel Team-Up #141–150 and Web of Spider-Man #1 from May 1984 to April 1985. It features Spider-Man wearing the alien costume he brought home from Battleworld and discovering his new costume is alive.

Plot
Following the Secret Wars, Spider-Man returns to Earth from Battleworld wearing a black costume. He discovers the black costume creates its own webbing and can disguise itself as street clothes according to his mental commands. Meanwhile, the mob boss Rose orders the murder of football player Ray Nesters. Spider-Man stops Rose's henchmen, then raids Rose's warehouse prompting Rose to hire Puma to kill Spider-Man. They fight, and Spider-Man is injured when he protects bystanders from debris. Puma decides not to continue the fight until Spider-Man has healed. Later, Peter Parker's girlfriend Mary Jane Watson reveals she has known about his double life as Spider-Man for years. That night, the black costume slips over Spider-Man and takes him out for exercise while he continues to sleep. While out, Peter has a nightmare where his old costume fights the new one. When he wakes, Spider-Man realizes the black costume is leaving him tired.

Spider-Man asks Mr. Fantastic for help, and tests reveal the suit is a living symbiote that has bonded mentally and physically with Spider-Man, and that it is sensitive to sound. When the symbiote tries to graft itself to Spider-Man's body permanently, Mr. Fantastic removes it from Spider-Man's body with a sonic blaster and locks it in a containment cell. Meanwhile, Rose hires the Hobgoblin to attack the Osborn Corporation and Spider-Man wears his old red-and-blue costume to stop him. During the fight, the symbiote escapes from the containment cell returns to Spider-Man's apartment. It disguises itself in such a way that Spider-Man puts it on again, then it tries to take control of him. While battling one of the Vulturions, Spider-Man makes his way to a church bell tower where he uses the sound of the bells to free himself. The symbiote flees the loud sounds and Spider-Man believes it is destroyed.

Aftermath
In Spectacular Spider-Man #99, Spider-Man starts wearing a cloth version of the black costume that was given to him by the Black Cat. But in The Amazing Spider-Man #298-300, it was revealed the symbiote survives and stays in the church until it bonds with disgraced Daily Globe reporter Eddie Brock, who blames Spider-Man for the demise of his career, and becomes Venom to seek revenge on Spider-Man. After defeating Venom, Spider-Man officially returns to his original red-and-blue costume.

Background and creation 
The idea for a new costume for Spider-Man that would later become the character Venom was conceived of by a Marvel Comics reader from Norridge, Illinois named Randy Schueller. Marvel purchased the idea for $220.00 after the editor-in-chief at the time, Jim Shooter, sent Schueller a letter acknowledging Marvel's desire to acquire the idea from him, in 1982. Schueller's design was then modified by Mike Zeck, becoming the Symbiote costume.

Shooter came up with the idea of switching Spider-Man to a black-and-white costume, possibly influenced by the intended costume design for the new Spider-Woman, with artists Mike Zeck and Rick Leonardi, as well as others, designing the black-and-white costume.  Writer/artist John Byrne states on his website that the idea for a costume made of self-healing biological material was one he originated when he was the artist on  Iron Fist  to explain how that character's costume was constantly being torn and then apparently repaired by the next issue, explaining that he ended up not using the idea on that title, but that Roger Stern later asked him if he could use the idea for Spider-Man's alien costume. Stern in turn plotted the issue in which the costume first appeared but then left the title. It was writer Tom DeFalco and artist Ron Frenz who had established that the costume was a sentient alien being and also that it was vulnerable to high sonic energy during their run on The Amazing Spider-Man.

By mid-1984, Tom DeFalco and Ron Frenz took over scripting and penciling. DeFalco helped establish Parker and Watson's mature relationship; in The Amazing Spider-Man #257 (Oct. 1984), Watson tells Parker that she knows he is Spider-Man, and in #259 (Dec. 1984), she reveals to Parker the extent of her troubled childhood. Other notable issues of the DeFalco-Frenz era include #252 (May 1984), with the first appearance of Spider-Man's black costume, which the hero would wear almost exclusively for the next four years' worth of comics; the debut of criminal mastermind the Rose, in #253 (June 1984); the revelation in #258 (Nov. 1984) that the black costume is a living being, a symbiote.
Al Milgrom took over scripting as well as art on The Spectacular Spider-Man with issue #90 (May 1984) and worked on it through #100 (March 1985).

Upon taking a serious look at sales figures for Marvel Team-Up, Marvel's editorial staff found that sales dramatically rose or fell with each issue depending solely on the popularity of that issue's co-star. Taking this into consideration, Marvel editor-in-chief Jim Shooter concluded that it would make more sense to have another Spider-Man solo series with guest stars appearing when the storyline and/or promotional needs called for it, rather than a team-up series which unnaturally forced guest-stars upon the story. The series ended with issue #150 (February 1985), to be replaced by Web of Spider-Man.

The Web of Spider-Man was launched with an April 1985 cover dated issue by writer Louise Simonson and penciller Greg LaRocque and featured the return of Spider-Man's alien black costume, which attempted to rebond with Peter Parker. Peter managed to rid himself of the costume again using church bells and the alien was presumed to have died after that.  The first issue featured a cover painting by artist Charles Vess.

Collected editions 

The Amazing Spider-Man #252–259 was printed into a graphic novel in 1988 called The Amazing Spider-Man: The Saga of the Alien Costume. Later, two trade paperbacks, titled The Amazing Spider-Man: The Complete Alien Costume Saga were released; they contained The Amazing Spider-Man #252–263, Marvel Team-Up #141–150, The Spectacular Spider-Man #90–100 and Web of Spider-Man #1. The Amazing Spider-Man #252-259 & Web of Spider-Man #1 were also reprinted in Spider-Man: The Birth of Venom which tell the origin of Venom.

In other media

Television 
 The "Alien Costume Saga" was loosely adapted into the Spider-Man: The Animated Series three-part episode "The Alien Costume" which was later part of the direct-to-video Spider-Man: The Venom Saga. Differences in the plot include the symbiote coming from the Promethium X instead of Battleworld like in the Secret Wars comic book. The symbiote also gave Spider-Man a more aggressive attitude instead of making him tired and drained, the first official media to do this approach to the symbiote. Instead of Mr. Fantastic like in the comic book, Spider-Man went to Curt Connors for help.
 The Spectacular Spider-Man contains elements from the "Alien Costume Saga" in three episodes; "Persona", "Group Therapy" & "Intervention". The symbiote makes Peter Parker tired & drained and, like in the '90s cartoon, makes him more aggressive. The symbiote slips onto Parker while he was sleeping and battle the Sinister Six. Just like in "Web of Spider-Man #1", Parker uses the church bell to force the symbiote off of him.

Film 
 The "Alien Costume Saga" was loosely adapted into Spider-Man 3. A meteorite lands at Central Park and an extraterrestrial symbiote follows Peter Parker to his apartment. While Peter sleeps in his Spider-Man costume, the symbiote assimilates his suit. Peter later awakens and discovers his costume has changed and his powers have been enhanced; however, the symbiote brings out Peter's dark side. After accidentally attacking Mary Jane Watson at a nightclub, Peter realizes the symbiote is corrupting him. Retreating to the church tower, he discovers he cannot remove the suit but that the symbiote weakens when the bell rings. Peter removes the symbiote and it falls to the lower tower, landing on Eddie Brock and turns him into Venom. During the battle against Sandman & Venom leading to events where Harry Osborn was impaled by his own glider, Peter uses a pumpkin bomb to destroy the symbiote while Brock dives in, killing them both.

References

External links 
 

Spider-Man storylines
1984 in comics
Superhero comics